Roberts-Vaughan House is a historic home located in the Murfreesboro Historic District at Murfreesboro, Hertford County, North Carolina.  It was built about 1805, as a two-story, five bay, Federal style frame dwelling with a gable roof.  The front facade features a large three bay tetrastyle pedimented portico in the Greek Revival style.  It was built by Benjamin Roberts, a prominent local merchant.

It was listed on the National Register of Historic Places in 1971.

The house is owned by the Murfreesboro Historical Association and houses its offices and the Chamber of Commerce. The Association also operates the Brady C. Jefcoat Museum, William Rea Museum, Dr. Walter Reed House, John Wheeler House, shops and the Agriculture and Transportation Museum.

References

External links
 Murfreesboro Historical Association

Houses on the National Register of Historic Places in North Carolina
Federal architecture in North Carolina
Greek Revival houses in North Carolina
Houses completed in 1805
Houses in Hertford County, North Carolina
National Register of Historic Places in Hertford County, North Carolina
1805 establishments in North Carolina
Historic district contributing properties in North Carolina
Buildings and structures in Murfreesboro, North Carolina